Box is a small village in Gloucestershire, England. Box has a population of about 400. Box lies at the edge of Minchinhampton Common, designated as a SSSI. The common is used for the grazing of cattle, and the absence of a cattle grid at the entrance to the village means cows are able to wander through its streets. The village holds annual produce show, pantomime and open garden events.

Economy
Historically, the area of Box was used for agriculture (as evidenced by farms around the village). Quarries were prevalent in the area, although by the turn of the 20th century the majority of those in Box had closed. Until the early 20th century, an inn was situated in the centre of the village. It is now a private dwelling. The village is served by the Halfway Café and Shop.

Architecture 
Many buildings in the village use Cotswold stone. Such buildings include the early 19th-century Box Terrace—a row of five (formerly six) terraced houses—as well as numerous other private dwellings. The 17th-century Box House overlooks Box Wood and the Nailsworth Valley.

Education 
Box has two schools. The co-educational Cotswold Chine School opened in 1954 to cater for students aged 7–19 with special educational needs. Beaudesert Park School, a co-educational preparatory school, has been situated on the west side of the village since 1918.

Religious sites 
The first place of worship in the village was a mission church built in 1880. The corrugated iron building was originally used for an infant school. After the First World War, the building began to house the village Sunday School and weekly Evensong service. The church lacked an altar and organ; musical accompaniment was played on a harmonium. The church was expanded in the 1920s by the rector of Minchinhampton, who oversaw the installation of a piano and provided the use of a portable altar, and the building itself was extended in the 1930s. By the outbreak of the Second World War, the village had begun to fundraise to build a permanent church. The foundation stone was laid by Bishop of Gloucester Clifford Woodward in 1951, and the building completed the following October. The church was consecrated by Woodward's successor, Wilfred Askwith. The church is dedicated to St Barnabas, and now offers a Eucharist service on Sundays and Holy Communion on Wednesdays.

References 

 David Verey, Gloucestershire: the Cotswolds, The Buildings of England edited by Nikolaus Pevsner, 2nd ed. (1979) , pp. 131–132

External links

 
 Beaudesert Park School

Villages in Gloucestershire
Stroud District